All Star Junior Festival 2023 was an interpromotional professional wrestling pay-per-view event organized by New Japan Pro-Wrestling (NJPW). It was held on March 1, 2023 at Korakuen Hall in Bunkyo, Tokyo, Japan. The event, which was produced by NJPW wrestler Hiromu Takahashi, featured the participation of junior heavyweight wrestlers from over 20 different promotions from around the world. 

In the main event, NJPW's Master Wato defeated All Japan Pro Wrestling's Atsuki Aoyagi. In other prominent matches, Taiji Ishimori defeated Soberano Jr., Shun Skywalker, Ninja Mack, and Yo-Hey in a five-way match and Hiromu Takahashi teamed with Fujita "Jr." Hayato and Amakusa to defeat Hayata, Yamato, and Kazuki Hashimoto.

Production

Background
On January 23, 2023, New Japan Pro-Wrestling (NJPW) officially announced the All Star Junior Festival. The event is produced by NJPW's Hiromu Takahashi and features junior heavyweight wrestlers from over 20 different Japanese and international promotions.

Participating promotions
As part of the event's publicity efforts, participants were announced each day throughout the month of February by their respective promotion on Twitter.

Storylines
All Star Junior Festival 2023 featured ten professional wrestling matches that involved different wrestlers from pre-existing scripted feuds and storylines. Wrestlers portrayed villains, heroes, or less distinguishable characters in scripted events that built tension and culminated in a wrestling match.

Results

See also

2023 in professional wrestling
List of NJPW pay-per-view events
Sky Diving J
Super J-Cup

References

External links
Official website

2023 in professional wrestling
2023 in Tokyo
Events in Tokyo
Professional wrestling joint events
New Japan Pro-Wrestling shows